Kosmos 656 ( meaning Cosmos 656) was an unmanned test of the Soyuz 7K-T, a variant of the Soyuz spacecraft. This Soyuz variant was intended for flights to the Almaz military space stations.

Mission parameters
Mass: 
Perigee: 
Apogee: 
Inclination: 51.6°
Period: 90.0 minutes

References

Kosmos satellites
Soyuz uncrewed test flights
1974 in the Soviet Union
Spacecraft launched in 1974